Brockerhoff Hotel is a historic hotel located at Bellefonte, Centre County, Pennsylvania.  It was built in 1866, and is a large brick building on a stone foundation, measuring 170 feet by 60 feet.  The original building was executed in the Italianate style. It was renovated in the 1880s to have a mansard roof in a combined Second Empire / Queen Anne style.  The roof features multicolored slate. The building was built by Henry Brockerhoff (1794-1878), who also built the Brockerhoff Mill.

It was added to the National Register of Historic Places on April 11, 1977.  It is located in the Bellefonte Historic District.

References

External links
Brockerhoff Hotel: Virtual Walking Tour of Bellefonte, Pennsylvania, Bellefonte Historical and Cultural Association website

See also
 Contributing property
 Cultural landscape
 Historic preservation
 Keeper of the Register
 List of heritage registers
 Property type (National Register of Historic Places)
 United States National Register of Historic Places listings
 State Historic Preservation Office

Individually listed contributing properties to historic districts on the National Register in Pennsylvania
Hotel buildings on the National Register of Historic Places in Pennsylvania
Italianate architecture in Pennsylvania
Second Empire architecture in Pennsylvania
Queen Anne architecture in Pennsylvania
Hotel buildings completed in 1866
Buildings and structures in Centre County, Pennsylvania
1866 establishments in Pennsylvania
National Register of Historic Places in Centre County, Pennsylvania